Les années lycée was a German educational television series produced by Bayerischer Rundfunk, teaching French as a foreign or second language to young-adult German viewers.

See also
List of German television series

German educational television series
French-language education television programming